Alweg was a transportation company based in Germany known for pioneering straddle-beam monorails.

History
Alweg was founded by Swedish industrial magnate Dr. Axel Lennart Wenner-Gren in January 1953 as Alweg-Forschung, GmbH (Alweg Research Corporation), based in Fühlingen, a suburb of Cologne, Germany.  The company was an outgrowth of the Verkehrsbahn-Studiengesellschaft (Transit Railway Study Group), which had already presented its first monorail designs and prototypes in the previous year. The Alweg name is an acronym of Dr. Wenner-Gren's name (Axel Lennart WEnner-Gren).

Alweg is best remembered for their role in building the original Disneyland Monorail System at Disneyland, which opened in 1959, and the Seattle Center Monorail, which opened for the 1962 Century 21 Exposition. Both systems remain operational, with the Seattle Center Monorail still using the original Alweg trains which have traveled over one million miles. A third system, built in Turin for the Italia 61 exposition remained unused a few months after the exposition closed and was destroyed by a fire in the late 1970s, most probably set by vandals. The remnants of the system were scrapped in 1981, with the north station repurposed as an office building.

In 1963, Alweg put forward a proposal to the Los Angeles County Board of Supervisors for a monorail system that would be designed, built, operated and maintained within Los Angeles County, California by Alweg. Alweg promised to take all financial risk for the construction with the cost of the system to be recovered through fares collected. The supervisors voted down the proposal, mostly due to political pressures from Standard Oil of California and General Motors, which were strong advocates for automobile dependency. This move was greatly resented by famed author Ray Bradbury who supported the monorail project and resented the later move to build a subway in Los Angeles.

Alweg's technology was licensed in 1960 by Hitachi Monorail, which continues to construct monorails based on Alweg technology around the world.  What was for decades the world's busiest monorail line, the Tokyo Monorail, was completed in 1964 by what was then the Hitachi-Alweg division of Hitachi, and today's busiest monorail system, Chongqing Rail Transit, is also based on Alweg and Hitachi technology.

After Alweg ran into financial difficulties, Alweg's German operations were taken over by Krupp. Krupp wound up all Alweg operations by 1964.

In the 1960s there was a plan to build an ALWEG monorail in the High Tatras in Slovakia.

See also

List of monorail systems

References

External links

 Los Angeles monorail proposal (The Monorail Society)

 ALWEG
Vehicle manufacturing companies established in 1953
Manufacturing companies based in Cologne
Defunct companies of Germany
Monorails
Science and technology in Sweden
1953 establishments in West Germany
Vehicle manufacturing companies disestablished in 1964
1964 disestablishments in West Germany